Jona Mataiciwa is a Fiji rugby union player, currently playing for the . His preferred position is wing.

Professional career
Mataiciwa was named in the Fijian Drua squad for Round 3 of the 2022 Super Rugby Pacific season.

References

Living people
New Zealand rugby union players
Fijian rugby union players
Rugby union wings
Fijian Drua players
1999 births